This is a record of the Czech Republic's results at the FIFA World Cup, including those of Czechoslovakia which is considered as the Czech Republic's predecessor by FIFA. The FIFA World Cup is an international association football competition contested by the men's national teams of the members of Fédération Internationale de Football Association (FIFA), the sport's global governing body. The championship has been awarded every four years since the first tournament in 1930, except in 1942 and 1946, due to World War II.

The tournament consists of two parts, the qualification phase and the final phase (officially called the World Cup Finals). The qualification phase, which currently take place over the three years preceding the Finals, is used to determine which teams qualify for the Finals. The current format of the Finals involves 32 teams competing for the title, at venues within the host nation (or nations) over a period of about a month. The World Cup Finals is the most widely viewed sporting event in the world, with an estimated 715.1 million people watching the 2006 tournament final.

Czechoslovakia have been one of the better performing national teams in the history of the World Cup, having ended twice as runners-up, in 1934 and in 1962. Between 1930 and 1994 they qualified for 8 out of 13 World Cups they played qualifiers for, and did not enter in two other World Cups.

After the political split-up into Czech Republic and Slovakia, the official successor football team Czech Republic has been less successful at the World Cup than Czechoslovakia, qualifying only for one out of the seven tournaments held since (the 2006 FIFA World Cup) without surviving the group phase. 

Throughout the World Cup history, Brazil became the team's historical rival. The two countries have met each other five times but the Czechs (always as Czechoslovakia) never managed to win, with three victories for the Brazilian side and two draws. Two other historical opponents in the finals were (West) Germany and Italy with three encounters each: Czechoslovakia won, drew and lost once against the Germans and the matches against Italy all ended in a defeat.

Record at the FIFA World Cup

*Draws include knockout matches decided via penalty shoot-out

By Match

Record by Opponent

Record players

Top goalscorers

Awards

Team Awards

Second Place 1934
Second Place 1962

Individual Awards

 Silver Ball 1962: Josef Masopust
 Bronze Ball 1934: Oldřich Nejedlý
 Golden Boot 1934: Oldřich Nejedlý
 Silver Boot 1990: Tomáš Skuhravý 
 Golden Glove 1938: František Plánička
 Golden Glove 1962: Viliam Schrojf

See also

 Slovakia at the FIFA World Cup

References

External links
Czech Republic at FIFA
World Cup Finals Statistics

 
Countries at the FIFA World Cup
Czech Republic national football team